The Annual Review of Statistics and Its Application is a peer-reviewed scientific journal published by Annual Reviews. It releases an annual volume of review articles relevant to the field of statistics. It has been in publication since 2014. The editor is Nancy Reid. As of 2022, Journal Citation Reports gives the journal  a 2021 impact factor of 7.917.

History
The Annual Review of Statistics and Its Application was first published in 2014 by nonprofit publisher Annual Reviews. Its founding editor was Stephen E. Fienberg. Following Fienberg's death in 2016, associate editor Nancy Reid completed the 2017 volume, of which Feinberg is credited as editor.  Reid is credited as editor beginning in 2018.  Though the journal was initially published in print, as of 2021 it is only published electronically. Some of its articles are available online prior to the volume publication date.

Scope and indexing
The Annual Review of Statistics and Its Application publishes review articles about methodological advances in statistics and the use of computational tools that make the advances possible. As of 2022, Journal Citation Reports lists the journal's 2021 impact factor as 7.917, ranking it second of 125 journal titles in the category "Statistics and Probability" and third of 108 titles in "Mathematics, Interdisciplinary Applications". It is abstracted and indexed in Scopus, Science Citation Index Expanded, and Inspec.

References 

 

Statistics and Its Application
Annual journals
Publications established in 2014
English-language journals
Statistics journals